The 2020 United States House of Representatives election in Vermont was held on November 3, 2020, to elect the U.S. Representative from . The elections coincided with the 2020 U.S. presidential election, as well as other elections to the House of Representatives, elections to the United States Senate and various state and local elections.

Democratic primary

Candidates

Nominee
Peter Welch, incumbent U.S. Representative

Eliminated in primary
Ralph Corbo, activist

Results

Republican primary

Candidates

Nominee
 Miriam Berry, nurse and screenplay writer

Eliminated in primary
Jimmy Rodriguez, activist
Justin Tuthill, consultant
Anya Tynio, sales representative for Newport Daily Express and nominee for this district in 2018

Results

Progressive primary

Candidates

Nominee
 John Christopher Brimmer, secretary of the Progressive State Committee, chair of Caledonia County Progressive Committee, Zoning & Planning Administrator of Fairlee (ran to secure Progressive nomination, dropped out before general election)

Eliminated in primary
 Cris Ericson, perennial candidate

Results

Independents and other parties

Candidates

Declared
Peter R. Becker
 Christopher Helali (Party of Communists USA), former U.S. Army officer, chair of the Orange County Progressive Committee, and organic farmer
Marcia Horne, Republican nominee for the Essex-Orleans district in 2014 and 2016
Shawn Orr
Jerry Trudell, renewable energy activist, pilot, and perennial candidate

General election

Predictions

Polling

Results

See also
2020 Vermont elections

Notes

References

External links
 
 
  (State affiliate of the U.S. League of Women Voters)
 

Official campaign websites
 Miriam Berry (R) for Congress 
 Christopher Helali (Com) for Congress
 Jerry Trudell (I) for Congress 
 Peter Welch (D) for Congress

Debates and forums
CCTV Channel 17 Town Meeting TV – Republican Primary Forum – Representative to Congress 7/30/2020
CCTV Channel 17 Town Meeting TV – Democratic Primary Forum – Representative to Congress 7/31/2020
Brattleboro Community TV – Communist US House Candidate Forum 9/9/2020
CCTV Channel 17 Town Meeting TV Forum – Vermont Representative to Congress 9/17/2020
The Vanguard – Communist US House Candidate Interview 9/23/2020

Vermont
2020
House